"Paso (The Nini Anthem)" is a song by Spanish disc jockey and producer Sak Noel. It was released on 10 January 2012, was written and produced by Sak Noel. The song has peaked to number 45 on the Austrian Singles Chart.

Music video
A music video to accompany the release of "Paso (The Nini Anthem)" was first released onto YouTube on 8 December 2011 at a total length of four minutes and twenty seconds.

Track listings
Digital download
 "Paso (The Nini Anthem)" [Radio Edit] – 3:17
 "Paso (The Nini Anthem)" [Extended Version] - 4:02
 "Paso (The Nini Anthem)" [Clean Radio Edit] - 3:18

UK Digital EP download 
 "Paso (The Nini Anthem)" [UK Edit] - 2:35
 "Paso (The Nini Anthem)" [Radio Edit] – 3:17
 "Paso (The Nini Anthem)" [Extended Mix] - 4:02
 "Paso (The Nini Anthem)" [Kat Krazy Radio Edit] - 3:08
 "Paso (The Nini Anthem)" [Kat Krazy Mix] - 4:21
 "Paso (The Nini Anthem)" [XNRG Mix] - 4:37

German CD Single
 "Paso (The Nini Anthem)" [Radio Edit] - 3:18
 "Paso (The Nini Anthem)" [Extended Edit] - 4:03

Charts

Weekly charts

Year-end charts

References

2011 songs
2012 singles
Sak Noel songs
English-language Spanish songs
Spanish-language songs